Lampa is one of Polish director Roman Polanski's early short films. The eight-minute piece, released in 1959, was the diploma film of a classmate of his, Krzysztof Romanowski, who was the cinematographer of the film, but Polanski directed it.

Plot
An elderly dollmaker is hard at work in his shop. Once he's headed off home, the film focuses on apparent whisperings amongst the miscellaneous doll-parts he's left behind. The shop then goes on to catch fire, but this remains unnoticed by the passers-by. Polanski can be glimpsed in a cameo role as a passer-by outside the shop.

References

External links
 

1959 films
Films directed by Roman Polanski
Films with screenplays by Roman Polanski
Polish black-and-white films
Polish short films